Living Sacrifice is the debut studio album by the Christian metal band of the same name, released through R.E.X. Records in 1991. The album exhibited a more thrash metal feel, which was the band's original style. They became more progressive every album, however, eventually sticking with more of a groove metalcore style.

Recording history
Living Sacrifice formed in 1989 in Little Rock, Arkansas, and released a three-song demo cassette tape, Not Yielding to Ungodly, in 1990. After getting signed to R.E.X. Records, the band mixed and recorded their debut album at Catamount Studios in Cedar Falls, Iowa, which was released in 1991. In 1999, Solid State Records released a reissue of the album. In 2021, Nordic Mission re-released Living Sacrifice with remastered audio for its 30th anniversary.

Critical reception

The album received mixed to positive ratings, with the band being heavily compared to Slayer. Jesus Freak Hideout reviewed the 1999 re-release of the album, giving it a 3.5 star review and stating that "Any fan of metal or Living Sacrifice looking to learn a little metal history would be wise to enroll in Living Sacrifice's self-titled debut." Steve Huey of AllMusic wrote "Living Sacrifice are still honing their style, but the record has a raw bite that will please most death metal fans, even if the subject matter isn't the traditional fare.", giving the album a 3 out of 5-star review.

Track listing

Re-recorded song from Not Yielding to Ungodly demo (1990)
Song included on Living Sacrifice's In Memoriam compilation (2005)

Personnel
Credits adapted from liner notes.

Living Sacrifice
 Darren "DJ" Johnson – vocals, bass guitar
 Bruce Fitzhugh – rhythm guitars
 Jason Truby – lead guitars
 Lance Garvin – drums

Production
Kurt Bachman – production
Doug Mann – production
John Thomson – engineering, mixing
Tom Tatman – engineering, mixing
Additional personnel
Jeff Spencer – art direction, design, photo manipulations
Sudden Images – art direction, design
Library of Congress – cover photo

Notes
1. "Second Death" and "Obstruction" were combined into a single track on the original 1991 version.

References

Living Sacrifice albums
R.E.X. Records albums
Solid State Records albums
1991 albums